Hebeclinium is a genus of flowering plants in the family Asteraceae, native to South America and Mesoamerica.

Species accepted by the Plants of the World Online as of December 2022:

References

 
Asteraceae genera
Taxonomy articles created by Polbot